Dimensional Insight is a software company specializing in the development and marketing of business intelligence and analytics software. Its flagship product, Diver Platform, delivers information in the form of reports, charts, and analytical applications.

History 
Dimensional Insight was founded in 1989 by Frederick A. Powers and Stanley R. Zanarotti.  It has subsidiaries in the People's Republic of China, Hong Kong, Panama, Germany, Norway and the Netherlands.

Products 
Dimensional Insight's flagship product, Diver Platform (Diver), is a business intelligence and analytics suite that allows users to combine multiple internal and external data sources into a single data feed that enables secure, role-based access to data via interactive dashboards and reports. Diver can also be used to send email alerts, to create PDF files, or to download data into Microsoft Excel files.

In addition, Dimensional Insight develops specific applications to meet reporting and analytics needs of both healthcare as well as supplier, manufacture, and distributor organizations. These applications include a revenue and expense tracking tool, productivity analysis tools, and a suite of executive dashboards, as well as physician scorecards, surgery scorecards, and a certified Meaningful Use solution.

The company emerged as the leader in the two top-right quadrants presented in Dresner Advisory Services' Wisdom of Crowds Business Intelligence Market Study in 2020. Diver was awarded first place in the Business Intelligence segment in the 2015 Best in KLAS report. It won Best in KLAS in healthcare business intelligence and analytics again in 2019 and 2020, scoring highly in the report for its corporate culture, customer relationships, and overall value.

See also
Business intelligence tools

References

External links 

Software companies based in Massachusetts
Business intelligence companies
Online analytical processing
Companies based in Middlesex County, Massachusetts
Privately held companies based in Massachusetts
Software companies of the United States
1989 establishments in the United States
1989 establishments in Massachusetts
Software companies established in 1989
Companies established in 1989